Owlsley may refer to:

 Owlsley (mascot), a mascot of Florida Atlantic University
 Leland Owlsley, also known as Owl, Marvel Comics supervillain

See also
 Owsley (disambiguation)
 Owlseye, Alberta